St. Francis Xavier High School was a private, Roman Catholic high school in Sumter, South Carolina, United States. It is run independently of the Roman Catholic Diocese of Charleston. It is now permanently closed.

Background

St. Francis Xavier High School opened in 1997 after only a few months of planning. It opened just months after the announced closing of Sumter Catholic High School in 1997. At its opening the school had 32 students, and five graduated that year.

In 2002, SFXHS began its first capital campaign. This was used to purchase the building it now occupies at 15 School Street in Sumter, and for significant renovations of the heat and air conditioning system.

On December 3, 2000, the Bishop of Charleston, Robert Baker, recognized St. Francis Xavier High School as an independent Catholic high school within the diocese.

References

Catholic secondary schools in South Carolina
Sumter, South Carolina
Educational institutions established in 1997
Schools in Sumter County, South Carolina
Roman Catholic Diocese of Charleston
1997 establishments in South Carolina